Colin James Graves  (born 22 January 1948) is an English entrepreneur, known for founding the Costcutter chain of convenience stores.

He was raised on a farm near Thorne, then in the West Riding of Yorkshire and attended Goole Grammar School.

Graves founded Costcutter in 1986 and was its chairman until 2012 when he stepped down, following his sale of the company to the Bibby Line Group. Between 2012 and 2015 he was executive chairman of Yorkshire County Cricket Club. He was elected as the deputy chairman of the England and Wales Cricket Board in April 2013. In 2015 he was elected chairman, to take office following that year's AGM, his term in office to last until the 2020 AGM.

Graves was appointed Commander of the Order of the British Empire (CBE) in the 2020 New Year Honours for services to cricket.

References

1948 births
Living people
British retail company founders
Commanders of the Order of the British Empire
English businesspeople
English cricket administrators
People from Thorne, South Yorkshire
Sportspeople from Yorkshire